Babhniyawan is a large village in Jagdishpur block of Bhojpur district in Bihar, India. As of 2011, its population was 9,945, in 1,540 households.

References 

Villages in Bhojpur district, India